Gongche notation or gongchepu is a traditional musical notation method, once popular in ancient China. It uses Chinese characters to represent musical notes. It was named after two of the Chinese characters that were used to represent musical notes, namely "" gōng and "" chě.

Sheet music written in this notation is still used for traditional Chinese musical instruments and Chinese operas. However usage of the notation has declined, replaced by mostly jianpu (numbered musical notation) and sometimes the standard western notation.

The notation usually uses a movable "do" system. There are variations of the character set used for musical notes. A commonly accepted set is shown below with its relation to jianpu and solfege.
{| class="wikitable" align="center" 
|- align="center"
!Gongche
|width="12%"|shàng
|width="12%"|chě
|width="12%"|gōng
|width="12%"|fán
|width="12%"|liù
|width="12%"|wǔ
|width="12%"|yǐ
|- align="center"
!Numbered musical notation
|1||2||3||(4)||5||6||(7)
|- align="center"
!Movable do solfège syllable
|do||re||mi||(between fa and fa♯)||sol||la||(between ti♭ and ti)
|- align="center"
!Simplified Japanese notation
|||||||||||||L
|}

Usual variations 

The three notes just below the central octave are usually represented by special characters:
{| class="wikitable" align="center" 
|- align="center"
!Gongche
|width="22%"|hé
|width="22%"|sì
|width="22%"|yī
|- align="center" valign="top"
!Jianpu
|5̣
|6̣
|(7̣)
|- align="center"
!Solfege
|sol||la||(between ti♭ and ti)
|- align="center"
!Simplified Japanese notation
|||||
|}
Sometimes "" shì is used instead of "" sì. Sometimes "" yī is not used, or its role is exchanged with "" yǐ.

To represent other notes in different octaves, traditions differ among themselves. For Kunqu, the final strokes of "", "", "", "", "", "" and "" are extended by a tiny slash downward for the lower octave; additionally, a left radical "" is added to denote one octave higher than the central, or "" for two octaves higher. For Cantonese opera, however, "" denotes an octave lower, while "" denotes only one octave higher.

Some other variations:
 "" is replaced by "" in the Taiwanese tradition.
 "" is replaced by "" in the Cantonese tradition.
 "" (⿰彳上), the "do" just above the central octave, is usually replaced by "" in the Cantonese tradition.

The following are two examples.
{| class="wikitable" align="center"
|+Gongche scale for Kunqu 
|- align="center"
!Gongche
|width="4%"|
|width="4%"|
|width="4%"|
|width="4%"|
|width="4%"|
|width="4%"|
|width="4%"|
|width="4%"|
|width="4%"|
|width="4%"|
|width="4%"|
|width="4%"|
|width="4%"|
|width="4%"|
|width="4%"|
|width="4%"|
|width="4%"|
|width="4%"|
|width="4%"|
|width="4%"|
|width="4%"|
|width="4%"|
|width="4%"|
|width="4%"|
|- align="center"
!Jianpu
|5̣̣
|6̣̣
|7̣̣
|1̣
|2̣
|3̣
|4̣
|5̣
|6̣
|7̣
|1
|2
|3
|4
|5
|6
|7
|1̇
|2̇
|3̇
|4̇
|5̇
|6̇
|7̇
|- align="center"
!Solfege
|sol||la||ti||do||re||mi||fa||sol||la||ti||do||re||mi||fa||sol||la||ti||do||re||mi||fa||sol||la||ti
|}

{| class="wikitable" align="center" 
|+Gongche scale for Cantonese opera 
|- align="center"
!Gongche
|width="4%"|
|width="4%"|
|width="4%"|
|width="4%"|
|width="4%"|
|width="4%"|
|width="4%"|
|width="4%"|
|width="4%"|
|width="4%"|
|width="4%"|
|width="4%"|
|width="4%"|
|width="4%"|
|width="4%"|
|width="4%"|
|width="4%"|
|width="4%"|
|width="4%"|
|width="4%"|
|width="4%"|
|width="4%"|
|width="4%"|
|- align="center"
!Jianpu
|5̣̣
|6̣̣
|7̣̣
|1̣
|2̣
|3̣
|4̣
|5̣
|6̣
|7̣
|1
|2
|3
|4
|5
|6
|7
|1̇
|2̇
|3̇
|4̇
|5̇
|6̇
|- align="center"
!Solfege
|sol||la||ti||do||re||mi||fa||sol||la||ti||do||re||mi||fa||sol||la||ti||do||re||mi||fa||sol||la
|}

Pronunciation 

When the notes are sung in different opera traditions, they do not sound as the words would be pronounced in the respective regional dialects. Instead, they are pronounced in an approximation of Modern Standard Chinese pronunciation.

The following are two examples:
{| class="wikitable" align="center" 
|+Pronunciation of Cantonese Gongche characters
|- align="center"
!Gongchecharacter
|width="9%"|
|width="9%"|
|width="9%"|
|width="9%"|
|width="9%"|
|width="9%"|
|width="9%"|
|width="9%"|
|width="9%"|
|- align="center" style="border-top:2px solid;"
!Cantonese GongcheJyutping
| style="border-top:3px;" | ho4
|si6
|ji6
|saang3
|ce1
|gung1
|faan1
|liu1
|wu1
|- align="center"
!Cantonese Gongchepronunciation
|
|
|
|
|
|
|
|
|
|- align="center" style="border-top:2px solid;"
!Usual CantoneseJyutping
|hap6
|si6
|jyut6
|soeng6
|cek3
|gung1
|faan2
|luk6
|ng5
|- align="center"
!Usual Cantonesepronunciation
|
|
|
|
|
|
|
|
|
|}

{| class="wikitable" align="center" 
|+Pronunciation of Vietnamese Gongche characters
|- align="center"
!Gongchecharacter
|width="9%"|
|width="9%"|
|width="9%"|
|width="9%"|
|width="9%"|
|width="9%"|
|width="9%"|
|width="9%"|
|width="9%"|
|- align="center"
!Vietnamese Gongche pronunciation
|hò
|xự
|y
|xang
|xê
|cống
|phạn
|líu
|ú
|- align="center"
!Usual Vietnamese pronunciation
|hợp
|sĩ
|ất
|thượng
|xích
|công
|phàm
|lục
|ngũ
|}

Rhythm 

Gongche notation does not mark the relative length of the notes. Instead, marks for the percussion, understood to be played at regular intervals, are written alongside the notes. Gongche is written in the same format as Chinese was traditionally written; from top to bottom and then from right to left. The rhythm marks are written to the right of the note characters.

The diagram at the left illustrates how the tune "Old McDonald Had a Farm" will look like if written in gongche notation. Here, "" denotes the stronger beat, called "" bǎn or "" pāi, and "" denotes the weaker beat, called "" yǎn or "" liáo. In effect, there is one beat in every two notes, i.e. two notes are sung or played to each beat. These notes in solfege with markings will show a similar effect:
do do do sol la la sol   mi mi re re do

Using this method, only the number of notes within a beat can be specified. The actual length of each note is up to tradition and the interpretation of the artist.

Notice that the actual rhythm marks used differ among various traditions.

History and usage 

Gongche notation was invented in the Tang dynasty. It became popular in the Song dynasty. It is believed to have begun as a tablature of certain musical instrument, possibly using a fixed "do" system. Later it became a popular pitch notation, typically using a movable "do" system.

The notation is not accurate in modern sense. It provides a musical skeleton, allowing an artist to improvise. The details are usually passed on by oral tradition. However, once a tradition is lost, it is very difficult to reconstruct how the music was supposed to sound. Variations among different traditions increased the difficulty in learning the notation.

The system was also introduced to Korea (where it is referred to as gong jeok bo) in ancient times and many traditional musicians still learn their music from such scores (although they typically perform from memory).

Kunkunshi, a Ryukyuan musical notation still in use for sanshin, was directly influenced by Gongche.

See also 
 Jianpu

References

External links 

Cantonese Opera (in Chinese) explains how the gongche notation is used in Cantonese opera. This document shows how the same piece of music is written in gongchepu, jianpu, and the standard notation.

Musical notation
Chinese music
Musical scales